The name Podul has been used to name four tropical cyclones in the western north Pacific Ocean. It is provided by North Korea and means a willow.

 Typhoon Podul (2001) (T0122, 26W) – a super typhoon that didn't affect land.
 Severe Tropical Storm Podul (2007) (T0717) – short-lived storm that remained over the open ocean.
 Tropical Storm Podul (2013) (T1331, 32W, Zoraida) – affected the Philippines and Vietnam.
 Tropical Storm Podul (2019) (T1912, 13W, Jenny) — made landfall in the province of Aurora, Philippines, and then in Vietnam.

Pacific typhoon set index articles